Syed Ali Zafar (Urdu: علی ظفر ) is a Pakistani senator and barrister, who was born and grew up in Lahore. He was Federal caretaker Minister for Law and Justice of Pakistan in 2018 and President of the Supreme Court Bar Association of Pakistan 2015–16. He remained President of the Pakistan chapter of South Asian Association for Regional Cooperation (SAARC) Law and a senior partner of Mandviwalla & Zafar, legal consultants. He is associated  as vice-president of the Human Rights Society of Pakistan. He earned his Bachelor of Laws (LL.B.) from the London School of Economics in 1983, and Bar at Law from England and Wales in 1984. He is also a political analyst and regularly writes in The Express Tribune on various political, social and legal issues of Pakistan. He joined the present ruling party, Pakistan Tehreek-e-Insaf (PTI), in 2019.

Politics 
Zafar is senator for the Province of Punjab, Pakistan in the seat of Technocrat for the ruling PTI party for the 2021–26 term. He took the oath as senator on 12 March and cast his votes for election of new chairman and deputy Chairman for the Senate.

He was appointed to discharge national responsibility as a caretaker Minister of Law and Justice for the 2018 general election in the cabinet of caretaker Prime Minister Nasirul Mulk and completed the interim Political period with transparency and merits.

He was candidate of the Independent group of Asma Jahangir and elected President of the Supreme Court Bar Association of Pakistan in 2015. He remained actively involved in lawyers politics, raised and solved many issues of the Bar and Lawyers.

Zafar followed the traditions and footsteps of his father S.M. Zafar and entered national politics. He joined Imran Khan president of Pakistan Tehreek-e-Insaf to render his services for the public and Pakistan.

Area of practice

Zafar has experience spread over 31 years as a practicing Barrister at the Supreme Court and High Courts of Pakistan. He has expertise in constitutional law, administrative law, energy law, services law, National Accountability Bureau (NAB) and banking laws, tax matters, company and corporate law, property law, competition law, mergers and acquisitions and alternative dispute resolution. He is known for his legal services in civil and criminal law and committed to protect the human rights of individuals. He is a senior partner of law firm Mandviwalla & Zafar, a leading law firm of Pakistan.

Memberships 
He is a member of the International Chamber of Commerce (ICC), the London Court of International Arbitration (LCIA), and played a role as arbitrator in various international arbitrations. He is a Life Member of the Supreme Court Bar Association of Pakistan, and the Lahore High Court Bar Association. He is a visiting professor and delivers lectures at various law colleges or universities in Pakistan and abroad. He regularly acts as a Judge in Legal Moots competitions.

See also

 Supreme Court Bar Association of Pakistan
 Lahore High Court Bar Association 
 S.M. Zafar

References

Living people
Pakistani democracy activists
Lawyers from Lahore
1963 births
People from Lahore